Kangerlussuaq Glacier (meaning 'large fjord'; old spelling Kangerdlugssuaq) is the largest glacier on the east coast of the Greenland ice sheet. It flows into the head of the Kangerlussuaq Fjord, the second largest fjord in East Greenland.

In 2016 the glacier had retreated further inland than at any time in the previous 33 years. Continued rapid retreat is likely.

See also
List of glaciers in Greenland

References

External links

 Glaciers Not On Simple, Upward Trend Of Melting sciencedaily.com, Feb. 21, 2007 "Two of Greenland's largest glaciers (Kangerdlugssuaq and Helheim) shrank dramatically ... between 2004 and 2005. And then, less than two years later, they returned to near their previous rates of discharge.

Glaciers of Greenland